Limacia is a genus of sea slugs,  dorid nudibranchs, marine gastropod molluscs in the family Polyceridae.

Species
Species within the genus Limacia include:
 Limacia annulata Vallès, Valdés & Ortea, 2000
 Limacia antofagastensis Uribe, Sepúlveda, Goddard & Valdés, 2017
 Limacia clavigera (O. F. Müller, 1776)
 Limacia cockerelli (MacFarland, 1905)
 Limacia iberica Caballer Gutiérrez, Almón Pazos, Pérez Dieste, 2015
 Limacia inesae Toms, Pola, Von der Heyden & Gosliner, 2021
 Limacia janssi (Bertsch & Ferreira, 1974)
 Limacia jellyi Toms, Pola, Von der Heyden & Gosliner, 2021
 Limacia langavi Toms, Pola, Von der Heyden & Gosliner, 2021
 Limacia lucida (Stimpson, 1854)
 Limacia mcdonaldi Uribe, Sepúlveda, Goddard & Valdés, 2017
 Limacia miali Toms, Pola, Von der Heyden & Gosliner, 2021
 Limacia ornata (Baba, 1937)

References

Polyceridae